Conduct may refer to:

Actions
 Behavior, the range of actions and mannerisms made by entities
 Human behavior, the way people act
 Work behavior, the way people act on the job
 Conduct disorder, a mental disorder
 Action (philosophy), that which is done by an agent
 Conducting, directing a musical performance

Other uses
 Conduct book, a genre of books that attempt to educate the reader on social norms
 Conduct money, money paid in some legal systems
 Conduct (album), an album by the band Fuck
 Conduct: An Introduction to Moral Philosophy, 1969 book by Ronald Field Atkinson
 Conduct (chaplain), a chaplain or a sub-chaplain of Eton or of certain colleges of Cambridge University

See also
 Misconduct
 Disorderly conduct
 Conductor (disambiguation) (includes conduction)
 Conduct unbecoming (disambiguation)